This is a list of women who are currently members of the provincial and territorial Legislative Assemblies in Canada.

Rankings
To date, no provincial or territorial legislative assembly has achieved exact gender parity between women and men. The Northwest Territories had near-parity after its 2019 election, which saw the election of 9 women out of a total of 19 MLAs. In 2021, a by-election resulted in NWT gaining a majority of women representatives, a first for Canada.

Women currently represent 34.9 per cent (270 out of 772) of all provincial and territorial legislators across Canada as a whole. As of October 11 2022, 2 provinces Alberta and Manitoba and Northwest Territories have a female Premier.

Representatives

Alberta

British Columbia

Manitoba

New Brunswick

Newfoundland and Labrador

Northwest Territories

Nova Scotia

Nunavut

Ontario

Prince Edward Island

Quebec

Saskatchewan

Yukon

References

Lists of women politicians in Canada